Lewis Warner Green (January 28, 1806 – May 26, 1863) was a Presbyterian minister, educator, and academic administrator who served as the president of Hampden–Sydney College, Transylvania University, and Centre College at various times between 1848 and 1863.

Early life and education
Green was born on January 28, 1806, in Danville, Kentucky, the twelfth and youngest child of Willis Green and Sarah Reed. Green was orphaned as a young boy, forcing him to live with his oldest brother, Judge John Green. His first education came by way of "renowned teachers" Duncan F. Robertson and Joshua Fry, and he began attendance at a classical school directed by Louis Marshall in Woodford County, Kentucky, at the age of thirteen. Afterwards, Green entered Transylvania University and completed the coursework through his junior year, but transferred in 1822 to Centre College because the "Presbyterians of the state, becoming dissatisfied with the infidel principles of (University President) Dr. Holley, had withdrawn their support from Transylvania". He graduated from Centre in 1824, becoming one of the two members of the school's first graduating class. Green took brief interest in law and medicine following his graduation, studying the former with his brother, John, and the latter with physician Ephraim McDowell, each for a short time. Green went on to study the Hebrew language at Yale College and also enrolled at the Princeton Theological Seminary in 1831 but did not graduate from either due to an urgent call back to Kentucky.

Career
He served as a minister in Kentucky and professor beginning in 1831 at Centre College. Around 1840, he emancipated his slaves. Then in 1840 he went as a professor to the Western Theological Seminary in Pennsylvania. He later served as president of Hampden–Sydney College from 1849 to 1856 and for about a year as president of Transylvania University. He served from 1857 to 1863 as president of Centre College.

It was during Green's presidency at Hampden–Sydney that a disagreement arose between the faculty of the Richmond Medical College (now the VCU Medical Center) and the Hampden–Sydney board of trustees in 1853. The medical faculty wanted the right to appoint any new member of their staff without the say of the board of Hampden–Sydney. This disagreement resulted in the Medical College being withdrawn from the benefits of the Hampden–Sydney charter, effectively becoming their own institution.

Personal life and death
He died on May 26, 1863.

Publications
His publications included the inaugural addresses at Hampden–Sydney in 1849 and at Transylvania in 1856. The later included a moderate attack on abolitionists.  His Memoirs, published posthumously in 1871 also included a number of his more important sermons.

References

Bibliography

1806 births
1863 deaths
19th-century American clergy
19th-century American educators
Burials in Bellevue Cemetery (Danville, Kentucky)
Centre College alumni
Centre College faculty
Hanover College faculty
Pittsburgh Theological Seminary faculty
People from Danville, Kentucky
Presbyterian Church in the United States ministers
Presidents of Centre College
Presidents of Transylvania University
Presidents of Hampden–Sydney College
Stevenson family